Kim Sun-woong (born November 1, 1991) is a South Korean singer and actor. He is a member of the South Korean boy band Touch. Kim is known for his lead roles in Ma Boy (TV series) and Thumping Spike 2. Kim also appeared in the movie Do You Love.

Discography

Filmography

Television

Film

References

External links 
 
 

1991 births
Living people
People from Ansan
21st-century South Korean male actors
South Korean male models
South Korean male television actors
South Korean male film actors
South Korean male idols
South Korean male singers
South Korean pop singers